In the Zone of Special Attention is a 1978 Soviet action movie, directorial debut of Andrei Malyukov.  It achieved cult film status among several generations of the Soviet Airborne Forces and veterans, and, along with Hit Back, it became part of their popular culture. The Soviet audience was approximately 35.4 million. The film was made with the political support of Vasily Margelov, a Red Army general who was commanding officer of the Soviet airborne troops.

Plot
Somewhere in the Soviet Union, a huge military exercise is in preparation, between opponents designated as the "Northern" and "Southern" army groups. As manoeuvres begin, the commander of the "Southern" airborne regiment designates three reconnaissance groups to be dropped far behind "Northern" lines, to find and capture the rival "Hidden Command Center" (HCO) and to set up a radio beacon to show the location of the drop zone for the main assault. Two of the three groups are soon captured by "Northern" counter-reconnaissance units. The third, led by Lt. Tarasov (Boris Galkin), manages to dodge all the traps set by the enemy.

"Northern" Mjr. Morozhkyn (Anatoly Kuznetsov), leading the pursuit, surrounds the place in the forest where the third reconnaissance group is expected, but the paratroopers manage to break through. Tarasov decides to split his group and sends his deputy, Praporshchik (Soviet Warrant Officer) Volentir (played by Mihai Volontir), to the arranged rendezvous.

Meanwhile, a group of armed criminals has escaped from a nearby prison. Having killed and injured some locals, they are now hiding in the area to which Prap. Volentir is heading. He encounters the criminals at a forest warden's hut, where they ambush him, badly injuring him. But Volentir is skilled in martial arts and knocks them all down. He calls the local police authorities on his radio, thus unmasking himself as the rival counter-reconnaissance.

Tarasov's group comes back together and reaches its target, but it turns out to be a fake underground construction built merely to deceive, and the pursuers are closing in rapidly.  Tarasov, an inexperienced young graduate of the Ryazan Airborne Military Command School, is desperate. He violently smashes everything within reach, finally sitting down crying and mumbling, "Like a kid, they treat me like a kid!". The wise and experienced Volentir encourages him and urges him to continue the quest, but he himself stays in the bunker to keep the pursuers at bay while the others escape.

By chance, Volentir finds an enemy communication cable and quickly figures out that it can lead them directly to the HCO.

There are fifteen minutes left before the mass paratroopers drop, and the "Southern" air force is now carrying thousands of paratroopers. Airborne commanding officers are shown sitting in the flying aircraft with their parachutes on, and still without information as to the location of the HCO and where to make the mass drop. They don't even know if Tarasov's group is still at large or already apprehended.

At the last moment Tarasov's group reaches and uncovers the HCO, and gives a radio beacon to the main paratrooper's force. After being dropped, the paratroopers headed by Tarasov seize the HCO. Tarasov faces with a general who commands the "Northern" army groups telling him: "The hidden command Center is destroyed. Sorry, comarade general."

Cast
Boris Galkin — guard lieutenant of the "Southern", Viktor Pavlovich Tarasov
Mihai Volontir — guard praporshchik of the "Southern", Alexander Volentir (voice Nikolai Gubenko)
Sergey Volkash — guard private "Southern", Alexei Egorov, fighter of Tarasov's group
Igor Ivanov — guard sergeant of the "Southern", Pugachev, radio operator of Tarasov's group
Anatoly Kuznetsov — Major Gennady Semyonovich Moroshkin, Head of counterintelligence of the "Northern"
Alexander Pyatkov — captain of the "Northern", Zuev ("Zuich")
Vladimir Zamansky — guards colonel, commander of the regiment "Southern"
Oleg Golubitsky — guard lieutenant colonel "Southern", Oleg Borisovich, Chief of Staff of the Regiment
Boris Bachurin — guard lieutenant "Southern", Pakhomov
Mikhail Chigaryov — guard senior lieutenant of the "Southern", Kirikov
Anatoly Vedenkin — guard praporschik of the "Northern" in the captured by the paratroopers UAZ-469
Ivan Agafonov — lieutenant colonel of the militia
Elena Kuzmina — shopwoman of the robbed shop
Nikolai Kryukov — old forester, grandfather of Pugachev
Elena Tsyplakova — granddaughter of the forester, Nastya
Mikhail Kokshenov — guard major "Southern", Smolin, duty officer
Sergei Podgorny — soldier-driver in the store
Yuri Chernov — duty officer of the "Northern"
Gennady Chulkov — lieutenant-colonel, head of "Northern" intelligence
Alexander Gai — major-general Protasov, commander of the regiment of the "Northern"
Irena Leonavičiūtė-Bratkauskiene — attendant
Victor Denisov — criminal
Victor Smekalin — criminal

Production
The film's title is a reference to the sector on the map located beyond the reach of radar, considered by "Southern" officers to be a "High Attention Area", where a rival HCO could be located. The main characters do not wear the standard camouflage gear of the Russian Airborne Troops, but outfits custom made in the sewing workshop of the Mosfilm studio. A lot of scenes were cut from the movie for reasons of military secrecy.

Release
At first, release of the film was forbidden. The State Political Directorate issued a note prohibiting "a movie glorifying a power of our army, because it will play into the hands of the enemies of international détente".

In an interview in February 2007, director Andrei Malyukov said that he still did not know in which countries his movie had been released, this being restricted information. It went to a few dozen countries, however. In 2008, the film was shown at a festival of military history films.

References

External links

1970s action war films
Soviet action war films
1978 directorial debut films
1978 films
Films directed by Andrei Malyukov